The Forgotten is a 2014 British horror film, helmed by Oliver Frampton in his directorial debut, that premiered on 22 August 2014 at FrightFest, featuring a teenage protagonist who becomes the focus of attention of a ghost.

Plot
Tommy (Clem Tibber) is a fourteen-year-old boy who goes to live with his father Mark (Shaun Dingwall) after his mother has a nervous breakdown. Dismayed upon learning that his father is now a squatter in an empty council estate destined for demolition, he nonetheless tries to make the best of it. Tommy is awoken each night by strange noises and on one occasion, finds that he and all of his belongings have been dragged from one side of the room to the other. Growing ever more terrified, Tommy tries to talk to his father but finds him becoming ever more bizarre and disturbing in behaviour.

Cast
Clem Tibber as Tommy
Shaun Dingwall as Mark
Elarica Gallacher as Carmen
James Doherty as Martin
Lyndsey Marshal as Sarah
Lee Arnold as Police Officer
Isaura Barbé-Brown as Carmen's Mother
James Capel as Ian Wilson
Luke Kidd as Youth
Carys Lewis as Nurse
Jennifer Matter as Candy
Katherine Mount as Anna
Conor Short as Adam

Reception
SciFiNow wrote a mostly positive review, writing "There are one or two hiccups along the way, and the loose ends are all tied up a little too neatly to bring about the finale, but it’s a strong finish for a film that slowly finds its way under your skin. Genuinely affecting and chilling, this is an impressive and mournful debut." The Screen Daily was also mixed in their review, stating "The haunted, empty flat – with its red walls and deep shadows – is an impressive locale, but the ghost story element is a little too ordinary to leave a lasting impression." Nerdly wrote a similar opinion, ultimately saying that the movie "is a fantastic British horror movie that, even with its flaws, should be seen by all and marks director Oliver Frampton and writer James Hall as ones to watch."

References

External links

2014 horror films
British horror films
2014 directorial debut films
Squatting in film
2010s English-language films
2010s British films